Amaka Igwe  (2 January 1963 – 28 April 2014) was a Nigerian filmmaker and broadcasting executive. Igwe was the owner of Top Radio 90.9 Lagos and Amaka Igwe Studios. She was recognized as one of the second-generation filmmakers who helped begin the video film era of Nigerian cinema. She remained a prominent figure in the industry until her death in 2014 resulting from an asthma attack.

On 2 January 2020, Igwe was honoured on her 57th posthumous birthday with a Google Doodle.

Early life and education
Uzoamaka Audrey "Amaka" Igwe was born to Isaac and Patience Ene on 2 January 1963 in Port-Harcourt. Igwe was the fifth of seven children, and the fourth of six sisters. She was known as "GCO" (General Commanding Officer) by her father and "Storm" by her mother because she was always busy with some activity. As a child she acted as a Minister of Youth, Sports and Culture.

She studied at All Saints School and Awkunanaw Girls High School in Enugu. She boxed, played basketball, and was captain of the girls' soccer team. During her A-Levels at Idia College, Benin, Igwe began to explore her creative side. She taught people the Atilogwu dance, and competed nationally. She also began writing plays and songs. Amaka Igwe wanted to study law, but officials of the Joint Admissions and Matriculation Board (JAMB) offered her "Education and Religious Studies (Theology)" instead. Hence, she studied Education/Religion at the University of Ife (now Obafemi Awolowo University).

From OAU, Igwe jointed the MNET short celluloid film "Barbers Wisdom" as director and then proceeded to the University of Ibadan, where she obtained a master's degree in Library and Information Sciences. She spent her time during her National Youth Service Corps as a travelling secretary for the Scripture Union. She then worked at the Anambra State University of Technology as an executive director at Eida Information Systems before settling in the creative industry. She married her husband Charles Igwe in April 1993, and had three children.

Talent
Igwe was an accomplished writer, producer, director, entrepreneur and teacher. A pioneer of modern Nigerian TV drama and film, she hit national limelight as the writer and producer of award-winning TV soap ‘Checkmate’ and its offshoot ‘Fuji House of Commotion’. Her Nollywood projects include Rattle snake and Violated, which set Amaka Igwe Studios apart in the Video film era of Nigerian cinema. She founded BOBTV Exp., and was the founder and CEO of the Lagos mainland-based Top Radio 90.9FM station, the quality content production powerhouse, Amaka Igwe Studios and Q Entertainment Networks, and DSTV channel.

Legacy

Igwe will be remembered for raising the bar in movie and TV production in Nigeria, setting, attaining and maintaining high standards with her company Amaka Igwe Studios at a time when Nollywood was not taken seriously, for not conforming to low standards as a means to achieving success and for inspiring many Nigerian movie makers, Nigerians, and the world as a whole.

A sense of duty to and respect for God, her family, excellence in everything, the integrity and quality of her work, and tradition in general was an integral part of Amaka. She loved her family, and resolved to always be there for them. Amaka Igwe invested in people, and they remain her testimony. She often told those she directly trained that she would give them what she has so they could add to what they have and be better than her. She never thought she was indispensable, and she was committed to the growth and sustenance of the Creative Industries.

Honors and tribute
Igwe won a number of awards during her career. In 2011, Nigeria recognized her substantial efforts and immense contributions to the creative industry by awarding her with the Nigerian National Order of '"MFR," which stands for "Member of The Federal Republic of Nigeria."

On 2 January 2020, Google celebrated her 57th birthday with a Google Doodle.

Death
Igwe died in Enugu on 27 April 2014 at 8:30 pm, after efforts failed to save her from an asthma exacerbation. Her funeral was attended by Rochas Okorocha, the then governor of Imo State, as well as personalities from the Nollywood film industry.

Quotes

 "I am an unapologetic commercial filmmaker. I make films to make money."
 "I will give you all I have, so you can add it to what you have and be better than me."
 "By the Special Grace of God."
 "Mr. President, what is Arik Air without an airport?"
 "Nollywood is a global movement."

Filmography
Rattle Snake 1,2 & 3
Violated 1&2
To Live Again
Full Circle
A Barber's Wisdom

TV series
Fuji House of Commotion
Solitaire
Now We Are Married
Infinity Hospital
Bless This House
Checkmate

References

Bibliography
Ofoma, D. (2022). Spotlight: Amaka Igwe. Invisible Women : Bringing female filmmakers from archives to screens, accessed on 19 April 2022
"Amaka Igwe - She Came, She Saw, She Made a Difference". Africa News Service. 5 May 2014. Opposing Viewpoints in Context. Web. 28 April 2016.
"Charles Igwe's Touching Eulogy to Late Wife, Amaka" (23 June 2014). Africa News Service.
Esonwanne, U. (2008). Interviews with Amaka Igwe, Tunde Kelani, and Kenneth Nnebue. Research in African Literatures (4), 24.
Haynes, J., & Okome, O. (1998). "Evolving popular media: Nigerian video films". Research in African Literatures 29(3), 106–128. 
"How Amaka Igwe died with her numerous visions", nigeriafilms.com, 5 May 2016.
African Film Festival, New York.
 "Google Doodle Pays Tribute To Late Nigerian Iconic Filmmaker, Amaka Igwe"

External links

Amaka Igwe at the Africa Film Academy

1963 births
2014 deaths
People from Enugu
Members of the Order of the Federal Republic
Obafemi Awolowo University alumni
University of Ibadan alumni
AMVCA Industry Merit Award winners
Lifetime Achievement Award Africa Movie Academy Award winners
Nigerian women film directors
Nigerian film producers
Nigerian writers
Nigerian television producers
Nigerian businesspeople
Nigerian women in business
Nigerian media personalities
Nigerian chief executives
Igbo people